Thierry Steimetz (born 9 July 1983) is a retired French professional footballer who played as a midfielder.

F91 Dudelange
In July 2012, he joined Luxembourgian club F91 Dudelange. He scored two goals away in a UEFA Champions League second qualifying round second leg match against Red Bull Salzburg to help his side to a famous victory. Despite losing 3–4 on the night in Austria, the aggregate result ended up 4–4, and Dudelange progressed on the away goal rule.

References

External links
UEFA profile

Thierry Steimetz career statistics at FootballDatabase.eu
Thierry Steimetz profile at foot-national.com

1983 births
Living people
People from Creutzwald
French footballers
Association football midfielders
RC Lens players
US Roye-Noyon players
CS Grevenmacher players
CSO Amnéville players
FC Metz players
F91 Dudelange players
FC 08 Homburg players
Ligue 2 players
Regionalliga players
Sportspeople from Moselle (department)
French expatriate sportspeople in Germany
French expatriate sportspeople in Luxembourg
French expatriate footballers
Expatriate footballers in Germany
Expatriate footballers in Luxembourg
Footballers from Grand Est